Kamal Marjouane (born March 1, 1965) is a former boxer from Morocco. Marjouane participated in the 1988 and 1992 Summer Olympics. In 1988, he lost in the quarterfinals of the men's lightweight division (– 60 kg) to Mongolia's eventual bronze medalist, Nergüin Enkhbat.

References
sports-reference

1965 births
Living people
Lightweight boxers
Olympic boxers of Morocco
Boxers at the 1988 Summer Olympics
Boxers at the 1992 Summer Olympics
Moroccan male boxers